Dihtiari is an urban-type settlement in Pryluky Raion, Chernihiv Oblast, Ukraine. It is located on the left bank of the Udai in the drainage basin of the Dnieper. Dihtiari belongs to Sribne settlement hromada, one of the hromadas of Ukraine. Population: 

Until 18 July 2020, Dihtiari belonged to Sribne Raion. The raion was abolished in July 2020 as part of the administrative reform of Ukraine, which reduced the number of raions of Chernihiv Oblast to five. The area of Sribne Raion was merged into Pryluky Raion.

Economy

Transportation
Dihtiari is connected by a road with Sribne, where there is access to Highway H07, which connects Kyiv and Sumy. In the opposite direction, the same road provides access to Pryluky and Pyriatyn.

Culture 
There is a historical monument in the settlement, the manor of Peter Galagan. It was built in the 19th century, the architect was P. Dubrovsky.

References

Urban-type settlements in Pryluky Raion